Klement Slavický (September 22, 1910, Tovačov, Moravia – September 4, 1999, Prague, Czech Republic) was a Czech composer of modern classical music.

Biography

Slavicky studied under Karel Boleslav Jirák and Josef Suk. He was inspired by Moravian folk music and the works of Leoš Janáček.  The best-known of his works are the double chorus Lidice, Rapsodické variace pro orchestr (Rhapsodic Variations for Orchestra), the sonata Přátelství (Friendship) for violin and piano, the dramatic fresco Cesta ke světlu (The Way Toward the Light), the brilliant Toccata from the cycle Three pieces for piano (1947) and Symfonietta IV, Pax hominibus in universo orbi, which was dedicated by Slavický to the United Nations for the 40th anniversary of its birth. There is also a song-cycle Oh, My Heart So Wretched, which sets five Slovak folk poems and which has recently (2010) been recorded by the soprano Marie Fajtová. The 12 Small Studies for Piano have been recorded in 2016 by the slovak pianist Zuzana Zamborska (Diskant, DK 0164-2131).

Selected works
 Moravian Dance Fantasias for orchestra (1951)
 Rhapsodic Variations for orchestra (1953)
 Rapsodie for Solo Viola (1987)
 Ej, srdenko moje (Oh, My Heart So Wretched) song cycle:
I. Nad Straznicu jasno (Here the Sky is Sunny)
II. Sohajku s modryma ocima (Sky-blue Eyes)
III. Tezko temu kamenovi (Heavy is that Weighty Boulder)
IV. Povez mi, ma mila (Tell Me, My Bonnie Lass)
V. Studena rosenka (There was a Chilly Dew)
VI. Byla sem esce mala (I was Small Then and Gawky)

External links
Extensive Biography
Obituary

1910 births
1999 deaths
People from Tovačov
Czech classical composers
Czech male classical composers
20th-century classical composers
20th-century Czech male musicians